The 1991–92 Cupa României was the 54th edition of Romania's most prestigious football cup competition.

The title was won by Steaua București against Politehnica Timişoara.

Format
The competition is an annual knockout tournament.

First round proper matches are played on the ground of the lowest ranked team, then from the second round proper the matches are played on a neutral location.

If a match is drawn after 90 minutes, the game goes in extra time, if the scored is still tight after 120 minutes, then the winner will be established at penalty kicks.

In the quarter-finals and semi-finals, each tie is played as a two legs.

From the first edition, the teams from Divizia A entered in competition in sixteen finals, rule which remained till today.

First round proper

|colspan=3 style="background-color:#97DEFF;"|1 March 1992

|}

Second round proper

|colspan=3 style="background-color:#97DEFF;"|11 March 1992

|}

Quarter-finals 
The matches were played on 26 March and 15 April 1992.

||1–0||0–2
||3–0||3–0
||1–0||0–2
||4–1||1–1
|}

Semi-finals
The matches were played on 27 May and 3 June 1992.

||3–1||2–3
||1–0||1–0
|}

Final

References

External links
 romaniansoccer.ro
 Official site
 The Romanian Cup on the FRF's official site

Cupa României seasons
Cupa Romaniei
Romania